Framji Cowasji Banaji, Esq. (3 April 1767 – 12 February 1851) was born in Bombay (now Mumbai) to a Parsi family. His father, Cowasji Byramji (1744-1834), was a merchant, trading in cotton and had trading links with China, England and various Indian cities. He was the lease holder of Poway estate (now Powai). During his lifetime he did much for the city and his country and its people for which a Framji Cawasji Institute (now Framji Cowasji Hall) was built after his death. Some of his achievements were:-

 First Justice of Peace in Bombay.
 First to introduce engineering contrivances in the matter of carrying water from one place to another by means of pipes .
 Sent native fruit Mango that was grown in his estate of Powai as a present to the Queen of the United Kingdom on 18 May 1838.
 He rebuilt a Tank at Dhobi Talao at his own expense. In recognition of this noble act, the well was henceforth known as The Framji Cowasji Tank.
 He funded building of the Tower of Silence at Chowpati hill (now Malabar Hill).
He along with his brothers and nephew funded building of Banaji Atash Behram in the memory of his parents Cowasji and Bai Jaiji in 1845.
He was instrumental in the success of the Elphinstone College, Bombay (now Mumbai).
He was also a benefactor of the student's Literary and Scientific Society (LSS) in India.

Commemoration 
Post his death The Education Board under the presidency of eminent educationist and Judge, Sir Erskine Perry, put below resolution before the committee and passed

"Framji Cowasji, Esq., resigned his seat in consequence of his advanced time of life. The eminent and good citizenship, and zeal in supporting every measure for public improvement, which distinguished our late much esteemed colleague, are too well-known to your Lordship (Governor of Bombay) in Council to need any notice from us, but in recording his death, which subsequently occurred, the Board feel a melancholy pleasure in thus publicly expressing the respect in which they hold his memory.” 

ON the evening of 22 September 1852, The Framjee Cowasji Testimonial gathering was called to discuss a suitable memorial to erect in his name. P LeGreyt who was chairing the testimonial, termed it an "extraordinary occasion" and said

“This is the first instance that has been known in which persons of the classes and denominations, of both natives and Europeans, have come forward to raise posthumous testimonial in honour of a native of this presidency”.

In 1862, Foundation stone was laid in his honour by Honorable Juggonnath Sunkersett to build Framji Cawasji Institute (now Framji Cowasji Hall).

In 1892, Memoirs of the late Framji Cowasji Banaji were published by Bombay Gazette Steam Printing Works. It was written by his great-grandson Khoshru Navrosji Banaji.

References

External links 
 
 Framji Cowasji Banaji - Profile
 A Tribute to FRAMJI COWASJI BANAJI
 Memoirs of the late Framji Cowasji Banaji
Almost 150 yrs later, Cowasjee’s noble cause still prevails

Indian philanthropists
Parsi people
1851 deaths
Indian merchants
Parsi people from Mumbai